Louis William Tordella (May 1, 1911 – January 9, 1996) was the longest serving deputy director of the National Security Agency.

Biography
Tordella was born in Garrett, Indiana, on May 1, 1911 and grew up in the Chicago environs. He displayed an early affinity for mathematics, and obtained bachelors, masters, and doctoral degrees in the 1930s. The outbreak of World War II found him teaching mathematics at Chicago's Loyola University. He joined the US Navy, immediately made contacts in the service, and was brought aboard as a lieutenant junior grade in 1942. He went directly into cryptologic work for the Navy's codebreaking organization, OP-20-G. He finished the war at OP-20-G collection stations on the West Coast, at Bainbridge Island, Washington, and Skaggs Island Naval Communication Station.

After the war Tordella stayed on with the Navy, and in 1949 joined the newly created Armed Forces Security Agency (AFSA), an early attempt to achieve service unity in the business of cryptology. He was a key figure in devising policy for the new agency, and for its successor, the National Security Agency, which emerged in 1952 to replace AFSA.

His career at NSA brought him to the very front rank of cryptologists. He was an early advocate of the use of computers for cryptologic work, and helped to cement a close working relationship with American industry. His grasp of computer technology and the associated engineering concepts, coupled with his understanding of cryptanalysis, led Tordella to push forcefully for the development of supercomputers for cryptologic applications. Tordella was also a leader in securing American communications, pushing a series of leading-edge new encoding devices to secure U.S. Government communications.

As a senior official at NSA, Tordella played a central role in NSA's outside relationships. Close collaborators in Britain and the Commonwealth of Nations built up such a trust with Tordella that many foreign intelligence officials regarded him as the linchpin in their relationship with NSA.

Tordella became the deputy director of NSA in 1958, and remained in the post until his retirement in 1974. He thus became the longest serving deputy director in NSA's history.

Tordella received unprecedented honors over the years. On his retirement in 1974 he received both the National Security Medal and the National Intelligence Distinguished Service Medal. His relationship with the British was recognized in 1976 when he became an Honorary Knight Commander of the Most Excellent Order of the British Empire. In 1992 the Security Affairs Support Association, composed mainly of retired intelligence officials, gave him the William O. Baker medal for distinguished service to American intelligence.

He died at the Bethesda Naval Hospital in 1996. 
He had both Waldenström's macroglobulinemia and colon cancer but no autopsy was done to determine what actually caused his death.

Aftermath
Following his death, sixteen boxes were recovered from his NSA office safe.  According to Budiansky, "...the documents turned out to be a compendium of every single one of NSA's most highly classified, compartmented programs of the post-World War II era."  Lew Allen ensured "no NSA department director ever again wielded such untrammeled power."

See also
Project Shamrock

References

1911 births
1996 deaths
Honorary Knights Commander of the Order of the British Empire
National Security Agency cryptographers
Deputy Directors of the National Security Agency
United States Navy officers
Recipients of the National Intelligence Distinguished Service Medal